James Dempsey (born 28 July 1959) was a Scottish footballer who played for Motherwell, Clyde, Falkirk, Partick Thistle, Dumbarton, Stirling Albion and Alloa Athletic.

References

1959 births
Scottish footballers
Dumbarton F.C. players
Motherwell F.C. players
Clyde F.C. players
Falkirk F.C. players
Partick Thistle F.C. players
Stirling Albion F.C. players
Alloa Athletic F.C. players
Scottish Football League players
Living people
Association football defenders